Whiteriver is a census-designated place (CDP) located on the Fort Apache Indian Reservation in Navajo County, Arizona, United States. The population was 4,104 at the 2010 census, making it the largest settlement on the Reservation.

Geography
Whiteriver is located at  (33.833005, -109.974547).

Demographics

As of the 2000 United States Census, there were 5,220 people, 1,249 households, and 1,054 families residing in the CDP. The racial makeup of the CDP was 95.1% Native American, 3.0% White, <0.1% Black or African American, <0.1% Asian, 0.3% from other races, and 1.5% from two or more races.  1.9% of the population were Hispanic or Latino of any race.

There were 1,249 households, out of which 56.4% had children under the age of 18 living with them, 43.1% were married couples living together, 34.3% had a female householder with no husband present, and 15.6% were non-families. 12.8% of all households were made up of individuals, and 1.3% had someone living alone who was 65 years of age or older.  The average household size was 4.10 and the average family size was 4.45.

In the CDP, the population was spread out, with 44.4% under the age of 18, 10.6% from 18 to 24, 28.6% from 25 to 44, 13.3% from 45 to 64, and 3.2% who were 65 years of age or older.  The median age was 21 years. For every 100 females, there were 91.7 males.  For every 100 females age 18 and over, there were 89.5 males.

The median income for a household in the CDP was $17,415, and the median income for a family was $17,774. Males had a median income of $18,490 versus $20,463 for females. The per capita income for the CDP was $5,719.  About 46.9% of families and 51.6% of the population were below the poverty line, including 59.2% of those under age 18 and 35.2% of those age 65 or over.

Religion

As of 2005, the Apache Reservation in which Whiteriver is located showed a decrease from 73% traditional or atheist to 43%. The percent of the population who consider themselves "Christian" was then 53%.

Transportation
Whiteriver Airport is a public use general aviation airport located one nautical mile (2 km) southwest of the central business district of Whiteriver.

The White Mountain Apache Tribe operates the Fort Apache Connection Transit, which provides local bus service.

Education
Whiteriver is served by the Whiteriver Unified School District.

Alchesay High School is the secondary school of Whiteriver.

East Fork Lutheran School is a Christian grade school and high school of the Wisconsin Evangelical Lutheran Synod in Whiteriver.

Climate
Whiteriver has a Mediterranean climate (Köppen Csa/Csb) with summers featuring hot afternoons and mild mornings, and winters featuring comfortable afternoons and freezing mornings. Unlike most climates of its type, the summer drought only covers the first half of the hot season – monsoonal rains arrive in July and peak in August before falling off in September. During the dry early summer wildfires are however always a risk.

See also
 Fort Apache Indian Reservation
 Bashas

References

White Mountains (Arizona)
Census-designated places in Navajo County, Arizona
Census-designated places in Arizona
White Mountain Apache Tribe